The Roman Catholic Diocese of Bogor is a diocese located in the city of Bogor in the Ecclesiastical province of Jakarta in Indonesia.

History
 December 9, 1948: Established as the Apostolic Prefecture of Sukabumi from the Apostolic Vicariate of Batavia
 January 3, 1961: Promoted as Diocese of Bogor

Leadership
 Bishops of Bogor (Roman rite)
 Bishop Paskalis Bruno Syukur, O.F.M. (November 21, 2013 − present)
 Bishop Cosmas Michael Angkur, O.F.M. (June 10, 1994 – November 21, 2013)
 Bishop Ignatius Harsono (January 30, 1975 – July 17, 1993)
 Bishop Paternus Nicholas Joannes Cornelius Geise, O.F.M. (January 3, 1961 – January 30, 1975)
 Prefects Apostolic of Sukabumi (Roman Rite) 
 Fr. Paternus Nicholas Joannes Cornelius Geise, O.F.M. (later Bishop) (December 17, 1948 – January 3, 1961)

References
 GCatholic.org
 Catholic Hierarchy
  Diocese website 

Roman Catholic dioceses in Indonesia
Christian organizations established in 1948
Roman Catholic dioceses and prelatures established in the 20th century
1948 establishments in Indonesia